Jan Keizer may refer to:
 Jan de Koning (politician) (1926–1994), Dutch politician
 Jan de Koning (footballer) (born 1949), Dutch footballer